Northrop Grumman Innovation Systems (NGIS) was a sector (business segment) of Northrop Grumman from 2018 through 2019. It was formed from Orbital ATK Inc. a company which resulted from the merger of Orbital Sciences Corporation and parts of Alliant Techsystems in 2015.  Orbital ATK was purchased by Northrop Grumman in 2018. Northrop Grumman Innovation Systems designed, built, and delivered space, defense, and aviation-related systems to customers around the world both as a prime contractor and as a merchant supplier. It had a workforce of approximately 12,000 employees dedicated to aerospace and defense including about 4,000 engineers and scientists; 7,000 manufacturing and operations specialists; and 1,000 management and administration personnel. With Northrop Grumman's reorganization of its divisions effective January 1, 2020, NGIS was split, with most of the sector merging with other Northrop Grumman businesses into a new Space Systems sector.

History 

A merger of Orbital Sciences Corporation and the defense and aerospace divisions of Alliant Techsystems (ATK) was announced on April 29, 2014. The two companies had collaborated on several previous projects, including the use of 400 ATK rocket motors in Orbital's launch vehicles. The deal officially closed on February 9, 2015. ATK's sporting-goods division spun off to form Vista Outdoor on the same day.

On September 18, 2017, Northrop Grumman announced plans to purchase Orbital ATK for US$7.8 billion in cash plus assumption of US$1.4 billion in debt. Orbital ATK shareholders approved the buyout on November 29, 2017. The Federal Trade Commission (FTC) approved the acquisition with conditions on June 5, 2018, and on June 6, 2018, Orbital ATK was absorbed and became Northrop Grumman Innovation Systems.

Organization

Flight Systems Group 
Based in Chandler, Arizona, the Flight Systems Group includes the Pegasus, Minotaur, and Antares launch vehicles as well as solid-propulsion and aerostructures programs. The company also operates a Lockheed L-1011 TriStar wide body jetliner, which is named Stargazer and is used to air launch Pegasus rockets carrying payloads into space. The Stargazer aircraft is also used for testing under specific programs. The Flight Systems Group became part of Northrop Grumman Space Systems on January 1, 2020.

Defense Systems Group 
The Defense Systems Group, based in the Baltimore, Maryland area, produces tactical missiles, defense electronics, and medium- and large-caliber ammunition. The division also produces fuzing and warheads for both tactical missiles and munitions; precision metal and composite structures for medium and large-caliber ammunition, military aircraft, ground vehicles, and missile systems; load, assembly, and pack (LAP) of medium caliber munitions; and propellants and powders for the canister and commercial markets. The Defense Systems Group became part of Northrop Grumman Defense Systems on January 1, 2020.

Space Systems Group 
Orbital ATK's Space Systems Group provides satellites for commercial, scientific, and security purposes. This group also produces the Cygnus spacecraft, which delivers cargo to the International Space Station. The group is based at the company's headquarters on Warp Drive in Dulles, Virginia. The Space Systems Group became part of Northrop Grumman Space Systems on January 1, 2020.

Products

Rockets 

 Antares, two- or three-stage medium-lift expendable launch vehicle
 Minotaur I, four-stage small-lift expendable launch vehicle
 Minotaur IV, four-stage small-lift expendable launch vehicle
 Minotaur V, five-stage launch vehicle used for geosynchronous transfer orbits and trans-lunar orbits
 Minotaur VI, five-stage medium-lift expendable launch vehicle
 Minotaur-C, four-stage small-lift expendable launch vehicle
 Pegasus, air-launched four-stage small-lift launch vehicle
 OmegA, A cancelled medium to heavy lift launch vehicle.

Rocket engines 
 GEM-40, solid rocket booster used on the Delta II rocket
 GEM-60, solid rocket booster used on the Delta IV rocket
 GEM-63, solid rocket booster used on the Atlas V rocket
 GEM-63XL, solid rocket booster planned to be used on the Vulcan rocket
 Castor 4, solid rocket used on the Maxus sounding rocket
 Castor 30, solid rocket used on the Antares rocket
 Castor 120, solid rocket used on the Minotaur-C rocket
 Space Launch System Solid Rocket Booster, based on the Space Shuttle Solid Rocket Booster

Spacecraft 

 Al Yah 3, communications satellite for Al Yah Satellite Communications
 HYLAS-4, communications satellite for Avanti Communications
 SES-16, communications satellite for SES S.A.
 Landsat 9, environmental satellite for NASA and United States Geological Survey (USGS)
 JPSS-2, weather and environmental satellite for NASA and NOAA
 ICESat-2, ice-topography satellite for NASA
 Transiting Exoplanet Survey Satellite (TESS), space telescope for NASA
 Ionospheric Connection Explorer (ICE), science mission for NASA
 Cygnus, automated cargo spacecraft to supply the ISS
 Dawn, space probe for NASA currently in decaying orbit around Ceres

Munitions 
 Mk310 PABM-T air burst rounds for MK44.

Firearms 
 XM25 CDTE, an airburst grenade launcher.

See also 

 Northrop Grumman business sectors

References 

Companies formerly listed on the New York Stock Exchange
Commercial launch service providers
Companies based in Dulles, Virginia
Manufacturing companies established in 2015
American companies established in 2015
Rocket engine manufacturers of the United States
Private spaceflight companies
Spacecraft manufacturers
Ammunition manufacturers
Defense companies of the United States
2015 establishments in Virginia
Orbital Sciences Corporation
Innovation Systems
2018 mergers and acquisitions
American corporate subsidiaries